The 2007 FIBA Africa Basketball Club Championship (22nd edition), was an international basketball tournament  held in the cities of Cabinda (Group A), Huambo (Group B) and Luanda (Knockout stage), Angola, from December 13 to 22, 2007. The tournament, organized by FIBA Africa, and hosted by Clube Desportivo Primeiro de Agosto, was contested by 12 teams split into 2 groups of 6, the first four of which qualifying for the knock-out stage.
 
Host team Primeiro de Agosto won the tournament.

Qualification

Draw

Squads

Preliminary round
Times given below are in UTC+1.

Group A

Group B

Knockout stage

Quarter-finals

9th-12th place

5th-8th place

Semifinals

11th place

9th place

7th place

5th place

Bronze medal game

Gold medal game

Final standings

Primeiro de Agosto rosterAbdel Bouckar, Armando Costa, Carlos Almeida, Felizardo Ambrósio, Francisco Jordão, Joaquim Gomes, Marques Houtman, Mayzer Alexandre, Miguel Lutonda, Olímpio Cipriano, Rodrigo Mascarenhas, Vladimir Ricardino, Coach: Jaime Covilhã

Statistical Leaders

All Tournament Team

See also
 2007 FIBA Africa Championship

References

External links 
 2008 FIBA Africa Champions Cup Official Website
 

FIBA Africa Clubs Champions Cup
FIBA Africa Clubs Champions Cup
FIBA Africa Clubs Champions Cup
FIBA Africa Clubs Champions Cup, 2007
FIBA Africa Clubs Champions Cup